Katamenes is a genus of potter wasps with species distributed in Europe and Africa. When originally named by Edmund Meade-Waldo, Katemenes was monotypic, containing only K. watsoni, but other species have since been moved from Eumenes to Katamenes.

Species
The following species are currently recognised as being classified within Katamenes:

 Katamenes algirus (Schulz 1905)
 Katamenes arbustorum (Panzer 1799)
 Katamenes dimidiatus (Brullé 1832)
 Katamenes dimidiativentris (Giordani Soika, 1941) 
 Katamenes flavigularis (Blüthgen 1951)
 Katamenes indetonsus (Moravitz, 1895)
 Katamenes jenjouristei (Kostylev, 1939)  
 Katamenes kashmirensis (Giordani Soika, 1939)
 Katamenes libycus (Giordani Soika, 1941)
 Katamenes microcephalus (Saussure, 1852)
 Katamenes niger (Brullé, 1836)
 Katamenes priesneri (Giordani Soika, 1941)
 Katamenes radoszkovskii Blüthgen, 1962
 Katamenes rauensis Giordani Soika, 1958  
 Katamenes sichelii (Saussure 1852)
 Katamenes tauricus (Saussure, 1855)
 Katamenes watsoni Meade-Waldo, 1910

References

 Carpenter, J.M., J. Gusenleitner & M. Madl. 2010a. A Catalogue of the Eumeninae (Hymenoptera: Vespidae) of the Ethiopian Region excluding Malagasy Subregion. Part II: Genera Delta de Saussure 1885 to Zethus Fabricius 1804 and species incertae sedis. Linzer Biologischer Beitrage 42 (1): 95-315.

Biological pest control wasps
Potter wasps
Taxa named by Edmund Meade-Waldo